Nalanda railway station, station code NLD, is a railway station and under Danapur railway division of East Central Railway. Nalanda is connected to metropolitan areas of India, by the Delhi–Kolkata main line via Mugalsarai–Patna route. Station is located in Nalanda city in Nalanda district in the Indian state of Bihar.

History

Nalanda city is having incredible history from very long past because Nalanda university was one of the oldest university of the world and was very important center of world for higher education. Many student from across the world used to come here to get quility education. Surjarpur(sun temple) and kundalpur(Birth place of Lord mahavira) are the place in city which is important pilgrim centre of hindus and jain respectively. Now Nagarjuna university in the city is centre of higher education. Good schools and colleges are available in city.

Location

As Nalanda a historical and Buddhist & Jainism pilgrims center. City well connected by rail and road network.
It's 85 km southeast from Patna and (80 km) northeast of Gaya, India, (20 km) from Pawapuri and 105 km from Vaishali (ancient city) .

Connectivity

Important trains

 Mahaparinirvan Express The Buddhist Circuit Train which is popularly known as Mahaparinirvan Express is a tourist train, which was launched by IRCTC on March 28 2007, to attract Buddhist pilgrims. Connects Rajgir, Nalanda, Patliputra, Varanasi, Bodhgaya, Sarnath, Vaishali (ancient city), Kushinagar etc.
 Shramjeevi Express connects Rajgir, Patna, Varanasi, Lucknow and New Delhi.
 Budhpurnima Express Also a Buddhist special train runs between Rajgir to Varanasi vai Patna and Gaya, India.
 Rajgriha Intercity Express runs between Rajgir and Danapur via Harnaut, Patna City.
 Howrah–Rajgir Janta Express connects Rajgir to Howrah via Asansol Jhajha Bakhtiyarpur.
 Howrah–Rajgir Fast Passenger to Howrah Junction from Rajgir railway station via Bakhtiyarpur Junction, Kiul railway station, Bhagalpur railway station, Barddhaman.

Nearest airport
Nearest airports are:
 Lok Nayak Jayaprakash Airport, Patna
 Gaya Airport

See also

 Nalanda

References

Railway stations in Nalanda district
Railway station
Danapur railway division
Railway stations opened in 1911